Ang Sila is a town (Thesaban Mueang) in the Mueang Chonburi District (amphoe) of Chonburi Province in the eastern region of Central Thailand. The name means "Stone Basin". The stone is used to carve culinary mortars and pestles, rice grinders, and statuary.

References

Populated places in Chonburi province